Sven Anders Runström (8 April 1896 – 25 March 1966) was a Swedish track and field athlete who competed in the 1920 Summer Olympics. In 1920 he finished tenth in the triple jump competition.

References

External links
profile 

1896 births
1966 deaths
Swedish male triple jumpers
Olympic athletes of Sweden
Athletes (track and field) at the 1920 Summer Olympics